George Crocker may refer to:

 George Crocker (businessman) (1856–1909), American heir and businessman
 George A. Crocker (born 1943), U.S. Army Lieutenant General
 George N. Crocker (1906–1970), U.S. Army officer, author, lawyer and businessman
 George G. Crocker (fl. 1843–1892), Massachusetts lawyer and politician